Lake Pozo Verde (translated as Lake Green Pond), is a lake of volcanic origin in San Carlos,  Alajuela province, Costa Rica.

Location 

Lake Pozo Verde is located in the Juan Castro Blanco National Park, on the slopes of Porvenir Volcano.

See also 
 List of lakes in Costa Rica

References 

Geography of Limón Province
Tourist attractions in Limón Province
Pozo Verde